Britta Phillips (born June 11, 1963) is an American singer-songwriter, musician, record producer, and actress.

Phillips' music career spans more than 30 years. She came to prominence in the mid-1980s as the singing voice of the title character of the animated television series Jem. With her husband, Dean Wareham, she has also been a member of the bands Luna and is one half of the duo Dean & Britta; she has also had a solo career, which has included one studio album, Luck or Magic (2016).

Phillips has also been a film, television, and voice actress, including a co-starring role in the 1988 music comedy-drama film Satisfaction and multiple voice acting roles on the Adult Swim animated television series Moral Orel and Mary Shelley's Frankenhole.

Early life
Britta Phillips was born in Boyne City, Michigan, but grew up in Bucks County, Pennsylvania. Her father, Peter, was a musician, songwriter, jingle composer, and a former music teacher of Paul Simon; he also worked on several Broadway plays. At the age of 19, Phillips moved to Brooklyn, New York, to pursue a career in music. In 1985, Phillips' father, through his musical contacts, secured an audition for her for the role of "Jem". Phillips was hired on the strength of her demo for the show's theme song, and that version was the one used in its opening credits.

Music career
Phillips was a member of the bands The Belltower, Ultrababyfat, and the Christine Keeler Affair in the 1990s, and Luna from 2001 to 2005. Since then, Phillips has released albums with fellow Luna bandmate Dean Wareham as the duo Dean & Britta. Wareham, a former member of the band Galaxie 500, toured with Phillips in 2010, performing the band's back catalog. Phillips has also toured with Ben Lee. Phillips and Wareham have also composed original score for the Noah Baumbach films Mistress America and The Squid and the Whale, and the Morgan J. Freeman film Just Like the Son. Their song "Knives From Bavaria" (from Sonic Souvenirs) appears in the Olivier Assayas film, Clean, starring Maggie Cheung. Their song "Your Baby" appears in the Italian movie A/R Andata e Ritorno, directed by Marco Ponti.

In 2001, Phillips provided vocals on the Anika Moa album Thinking Room. In 2007, Phillips produced and recorded a cover of Neil Young's "I Am a Child" for the benefit CD Cinnamon Girl - Women Artists Cover Neil Young For Charity. In 2010, Phillips performed vocals on the MGMT single "It's Working" from their album Congratulations. 2016 saw the release of her long-awaited debut solo album, Luck or Magic. It contains five covers, along with five original songs.

Acting career
Phillips' first acting job was as the singing voice of the lead character in the animated series Jem, alongside actress and singer Samantha Newark, who provided Jem's speaking voice. The series ran from 1985 to 1988.

In 1988, she co-starred in the teen rock band movie Satisfaction, which also starred Justine Bateman, Julia Roberts, Liam Neeson, Trini Alvarado, and Scott Coffey; the film is primarily known today as Julia Roberts' first credited big-screen role. Phillips performed several songs during the movie and is featured on the soundtrack album. Also in 1988, she guest-starred on the cult TV show Crime Story, in the episode "Always a Blonde"; she played a former homecoming queen turned high-class escort in Las Vegas, Nevada. She followed that with a starring role as a nurse in the pilot episode of the short-lived TV series Nightingales. From 2005 to 2008, she voiced various characters for the Adult Swim series Moral Orel, most notably Bloberta Puppington. In 2006, she featured as herself in the Luna band documentary Tell Me Do You Miss Me. Since 2010, Phillips has voiced various characters in Mary Shelley's Frankenhole, most noticeably Elizabeth Frankenstein. Both Moral Orel and Mary Shelley's Frankenhole were created by Dino Stamatopoulos. In 2010, Phillips appeared alongside Wareham on Yo Gabba Gabba!, in the episode titled "Ride".

Phillips had a cameo, along with Dean Wareham, in the 2012 Noah Baumbach film Frances Ha, written by Baumbach and Greta Gerwig.

Radio and podcast appearances
Phillips appeared on Ken Reid's TV Guidance Counselor podcast on December 9, 2016.

Personal life
Phillips married musician Jody Porter, but the couple later divorced. In 2006, she married musician and Luna bandmate Dean Wareham during the recording sessions for their album Back Numbers.

Discography
Solo album

Singles

References

External links
 Dean Wareham and Britta Phillips official website
 Luna official website
 
 
 
 Men's Vogue interview with Dean and Britta

Living people
1963 births
American film actresses
American voice actresses
Actresses from Pennsylvania
Luna (1990s American band) members
Actresses from Michigan
People from Boyne City, Michigan
People from Bucks County, Pennsylvania
21st-century American actresses
American television actresses
20th-century American actresses
American film score composers
Singers from Pennsylvania
Singers from Michigan
American women guitarists
Women bass guitarists
20th-century American bass guitarists
21st-century American bass guitarists
Guitarists from Michigan
Guitarists from Pennsylvania
20th-century American women singers
20th-century American composers
21st-century American women musicians
20th-century women composers
20th-century American singers